Thomas Loren Lenk (born June 16, 1976) is an American film and television actor, best known for portraying the character of Andrew Wells in the television series Buffy the Vampire Slayer.

Early life
Lenk was born in Camarillo, California, the son of Pamela Sherman, a teacher, and Fred Lenk, a tuba player, high school music teacher, and school district computer network administrator. He attended Adolfo Camarillo High School, and graduated from the University of California, Los Angeles, with a Bachelor of Arts.

Career

After launching his career in 1997 with small parts in movies, Lenk won his breakthrough role in Buffy in 2000. He appeared in twenty-seven episodes of Joss Whedon's show altogether, and also played Andrew in two episodes of its spin off, Angel. Among the many television shows in which he appeared as a guest star were NBC's Joey, House, Six Feet Under, Eli Stone, How I Met Your Mother and Nip/Tuck. His film roles have included small parts in Date Movie, The Number 23, and Transformers. He also appeared in the web series Border Patrol, which premiered in June 2008 on Atom.com.

Besides acting, Lenk is a singer and playwright. He has toured with the European cast of Grease and has written three plays. He took over the role of Franz in the Broadway musical Rock of Ages as of September 14, 2009, having originated the role in the Las Vegas and Los Angeles productions in 2006. From 2009 to 2010, he posted video blogs on YouTube summing up his experiences on Broadway, usually under the title "Tom's Broadway Blogs". He also contributes video content to Felicia Day's YouTube channel, Geek and Sundry, and parodies fashion on Instagram.

Lenk appeared in an episode of Psych that poked fun at Buffy the Vampire Slayer; Kristy Swanson, who played Buffy in the movie that preceded the television show, took part in the episode as well. He also performed in the June 2012 edition of Don't Tell My Mother!, a monthly showcase in which authors, screenwriters, actors and comedians share embarrassing true stories.

In 2013, Lenk joined the Lifetime series Witches of East End as Hudson Rafferty. In 2016, he appeared in the third season finale of Transparent. In 2018 he starred in Tilda Swinton Answers an Ad on Craigslist which has played in LA, Edinburgh, and London.

Personal life
Lenk is gay.

Filmography

Film

Television

Stage

References

External links

1976 births
Living people
University of California, Los Angeles alumni
American male film actors
American male television actors
Male actors from California
American gay actors
People from Camarillo, California
20th-century American male actors
21st-century American male actors
LGBT people from California